Sambalpur District is a district in the western part of state of Orissa, India. The historic city of Sambalpur is the district headquarters. The district is located in the Mahanadi River basin. It has a total area of 6,702 square kilometers, of which almost 60% is covered in dense forest. The district is bounded by Deogarh District to the east, Bargarh and Jharsuguda districts to the west, Sundergarh District to the north, and Subarnapur and Angul districts in the south.

Literacy
In 2011 the literacy rate of the district was 76.91%. The male literacy rate was 85.17% and female literacy rate 68.47%.

Education system
The education system in rural areas is government operated. Government runs primary, high and secondary schools. In urban areas the system is a mix of government and private operated schools. There are colleges for higher education both in rural and urban areas but most of them are located in urban or semi-urban places.
This is a list of educational organizations in Sambalpur district.

List of schools and colleges

References

 
Universities and colleges in Sambalpur